The 1938–39 Long Island Blackbirds men's basketball team represented Long Island University during the 1938–39 NCAA men's basketball season in the United States. The head coach was Clair Bee, coaching in his eighth season with the Blackbirds. The team finished the season with a 23–0 record and was retroactively named the national champion by the Helms Athletic Foundation and the Premo-Porretta Power Poll. They won the second-ever National Invitation Tournament (NIT) as well, going 3–0 in the tournament with a win over Loyola of Chicago in the championship game.

Schedule and results

|-
!colspan=9 style="background:#000000; color:#FFFFFF;"|  Regular season

|-
!colspan=9 style="background:#000000; color:#FFFFFF;"| National Invitation Tournament

Source

References

Long Island
LIU Brooklyn Blackbirds men's basketball seasons
NCAA Division I men's basketball tournament championship seasons
National Invitation Tournament championship seasons
Long Island
Long Island Blackbirds Men's Basketball Team
Long Island Blackbirds Men's Basketball Team